Laang Spean ("Cave of Bridges") refers to a prehistoric cave site on top of a limestone hill (Phnom Teak Treang) in Battambang Province, north-western Cambodia. The site's name Cave of Bridges hints to the many limestone arches (or bridges) that remain after the partial collapse of the cave's vault. Although excavations are still in progress, at least three distinct levels of ancient human occupation are already documented. At the site's deepest layers, around 5 meters below the ground, primitive flaked stone tools were unearthed, dating back to around 71,000 years BP. Of great interest are above layers that contain records of the Hoabinhian (11,000 to 5,000 years BP) whose stratigraphic and chronological context has yet to be defined. Future excavations at Laang Spean might help to clarify the concept and "nature of the Hoabinhian" occupation and provide new data on the Pleistocene/Holocene transition in the region

Documentation

Roland Mourer and Cécile Mourer-Chauviré working for the Royal University of Phnom Penh undertook the first excavations from 1965 to 1969 and almost immediately brought to light evidence of prehistoric human occupation in Laang Spean from as long ago as 6.240 years BP. Objects found included tools made of hornfel, pottery, burnt animal bones, carbonized matter, shells of mollusks and a great variety of micro fauna remains. In a deeper middle layer they found artifacts and tools, that "showed similarities with [] so-called Hoabinhian sites that had been uncovered in Southeast Asia, suggesting the possibility of a common cultural bedrock for a group of humans stretching from Burma to Vietnam." Thirty years of war and ten years of mine clearing prevented further excavations.

The French-Cambodian Prehistoric Mission - a team of Cambodian and French archaeologists and students - has resumed archaeological work since 2009 in room no. 2 (central part of the cave) over a surface of nearly  that provides new stratigraphic, chronocultural and archaeo-zoological results.

The Neolithic burial sites of four men and one woman dating from 3.700 to 3.300 BP. were found in one of the top layers. The fact that some graves were lavishly adorned with stone jewelry and others not at all, suggests emergent social stratification among the population and provides researchers with "an original chronological, cultural landmark for South-East Asia, at the beginning of the Ages of Metal".

The Hoabinhian level (later hunter–gatherers) contains split pebble tools and abundant faunal remains that dates between 11.000 and 5000 years BP.  The team discovered "a large stone featuring what appear to be etchings in the shape of an arrow, dyed with a redocher color...It could be the first case of art in Cambodia"[sic].

The team uncovered rudimentary stone tools (chert flakes and polyhedral, multiplatform cores) in the deepest Palaeolithic levels from as far back as 71.000 years BP.

See also
 Tam Pa Ling Cave
 Early hominids in Southeast Asia

References

External links
 Anatomically modern human in Southeast Asia

Archaeological sites in Cambodia
Former populated places in Cambodia
Caves of Cambodia